Klooga is a small borough in Lääne-Harju Parish in Harju County in northern Estonia. At the 2011 Census, the settlement's population was 1,203, of which the Estonians were 642 (53.4%).

During the German occupation in World War II, Klooga concentration camp, a Nazi labor camp, was situated there as a satellite camp of Vaivara concentration camp. On 19 September 1944, about 2,000 inmates of the Klooga camp were executed and the corpses burned on pyres.

A large area of the settlement is covered by Estonian Defence Forces' military training field Klooga training area.

Klooga has rail stations Klooga and Klooga-Aedlinn on the Elron western route.

Gallery

See also
Kloogaranna

References

Boroughs and small boroughs in Estonia